Codonanthopsis corniculata is a species of flowering plant in the family Gesneriaceae. This species is native to Peru and mainly grows in wet tropical biomes. Codonanthopsis corniculata, along with its other species in its genus, was first published in 2013.

References

Gesnerioideae